Suriya Tatakhun, who boxes as Chonlatarn Piriyapinyo (nickname: klang (กลาง); born in Amnat Charoen District (presently: Amnat Charoen Province), Ubon Ratchathani Province, Thailand) is a Thai professional boxer who fights at featherweight.

Piriyapinyo is dubbed as Sai-nam morana in Thailand. The nickname denotes "Deadly Tide" or "Crimson Tide", because his name "Chonlatarn" in Thai language means "river" or "stream".

He has challenged for the world championship for three times but lost each time.

He was the WBC Asian Boxing Council featherweight champion.

Professional career
Piriyapinyo turned professional in December 2003 at the Royal Square, Bangkok, Thailand. In his debut Piriyapinyo defeated Mwilambwe Banza on points over six rounds.

On November 9, 2012, he challenged WBA world featherweight champion Chris "The Dragon" John at Marina Bay Sands, Singapore, he lost a one-sided 12 round unanimous decision.

On November 22, 2014, he faced WBO world featherweight champion Vasiliy Lomachenko at the Venetian in Macao. Piriyapinyo proved to be no match for the two-time Olympic gold medalist, as he lost a one-sided 12 round unanimous decision.

On July 16, 2016, he lost to Miguel Berchelt by TKO in the round 4 for WBO interim champion title in Super featherweight weight class at Polideportivo Soraya Jimenez, Los Reyes La Paz, México, Mexico.

Professional boxing record

References

External links
 

Living people
1985 births
Chonlatarn Piriyapinyo
Chonlatarn Piriyapinyo
Featherweight boxers